The 2007 Scottish local elections were held on 3 May 2007, the same day as Scottish Parliament elections and local elections in parts of England. All 32 Scottish councils had all their seats up for election – all Scottish councils are unitary authorities.

Background
This was the first election for local government in Great Britain to use the Single Transferable Vote (the system is used in Northern Ireland), as implemented by the Local Governance (Scotland) Act 2004. The new electoral system resulted in most councils being under no overall control.

eCounting fiasco
Scanners supplied by DRS Data Services Limited of Milton Keynes, in partnership with Electoral Reform Services (ERS), the trading arm of the Electoral Reform Society, were used to electronically count the paper ballots in both the Scottish council elections and the Scottish Parliament general election.

Because of the fiasco in 2007 of holding parliamentary (Holyrood) and local elections simultaneously, the following Scottish local elections were held in 2012 instead of 2011.

Party performance
The Labour party lost control of all but two of its councils, Glasgow and North Lanarkshire, but received the largest number of votes, while the SNP were the main beneficiaries of the new voting system, picking over 180 new seats. The Scottish Greens elected their first-ever councillors, winning eight seats.

Results

|- style="background-color:#E9E9E9;
! scope="col" colspan="2" rowspan=2 | Party
! scope="col" colspan="3" | First-preference votes
! scope="col" colspan="2" | Councils
! scope="col" colspan="2" | 2003 seats
! scope="col" colspan="3" | 2007 seats
|-
! scope="col" | Count
! scope="col" | Of total (%)
! scope="col" | Change
! scope="col" | Count
! scope="col" | Change
! scope="col" | Count
! scope="col" | Of total (%)
! scope="col" | Count
! scope="col" | Of total (%)
! scope="col" | Change
|-
| style="background-color:"|
| style="text-align:left;" |No overall control
| colspan=3 
| 27
| style="background-color:#dfd;"| 20
| colspan=2 
| colspan=3 
|-
| 
| 590,085
| 28.1
| 4.5%
| 2
| 
| colspan=2 
| 348
| 28.5%
| style="background-color:#ffe8e8;"| 161
|-
| 
| 585,885
| 27.9
| 3.8%
| 1
| 
| colspan=2 
| 363
| 29.7%
| style="background-color:#dfd;"| 182
|-
| 
| 327,591
| 15.6
| 0.5%
| 2
| 
| colspan=2 
| 143
| 11.7%
| style="background-color:#dfd;"| 21
|-
| 
| 266,693
| 12.7
| 1.8%
| 0
| 
| colspan=2 
| 166
| 13.6%
| style="background-color:#ffe8e8;"| 9
|-
| 
| 228,894
| 10.9
| 0.8%
| 0
| 
| colspan=2 
| 192
| 15.7%
| 38
|-
| style="width: 10px" style="background-color:" |
| style="text-align: left;" scope="row" | Other
| 102,897
| 4.9
| 1.3%
| 0
| 
| colspan=2 
| 10
| 0.8%
| 6
|-
|- class=sortbottom style="background-color:#E9E9E9; font-weight:bold;"
! colspan="2" style="text-align:left;" | Total
| 2,099,945
| 100.0
| ±0.0
| 32
| 
| 1,222
| 1,222
| 1,222
| 100.00
| 
|}

Councils

The notional results in the following table are based on a document that John Curtice and Stephen Herbert (Professors at the University of Strathclyde) produced on 3 June 2005, calculating the effect of the introduction of the Single Transferable Vote on the 2003 Scottish local elections.

Notes

References

 
2007
Local elections|Local elections
May 2007 events in the United Kingdom